The 1987 NCAA Division I women's soccer tournament was the sixth annual single-elimination tournament to determine the national champion of NCAA women's collegiate soccer. The championship game was played again at Warren McGuirk Alumni Stadium in Amherst, Massachusetts during December 1987.

North Carolina defeated Massachusetts in the final, 1–0, to win their fifth national title. Coached by Anson Dorrance, the Tar Heels finished the season 23–0–1. This was the second of North Carolina's record nine consecutive national titles (1986–1994).

The most outstanding offensive player was Michelle Akers from Central Florida, and the most outstanding defensive player was Debbie Belkin from Massachusetts. Akers was also the tournament's leading scorer (3 goals).

Qualification
With the advent of the NCAA Division III Women's Soccer Championship in 1986, the tournament eligibility remained fixed for just Division I and Division II women's soccer programs. The Division II championship was not added until the following season, 1988. Nonetheless, the tournament field remained fixed at 12 teams.

Bracket

See also 
 NCAA Division I women's soccer championship
 NCAA Division III Women's Soccer Championship
 1987 NCAA Division I Men's Soccer Championship

References

NCAA Division I Women's Soccer Tournament
NCAA Women's Soccer Championship
 
NCAA Division I Women's Soccer Tournament